White People and the Damage Done is the second album by Jello Biafra and the Guantanamo School of Medicine. It was released on April 2, 2013 on Alternative Tentacles.

Track listing

Personnel
Jello Biafra – vocals
Ralph Spight – guitar
Kimo Ball – guitar
Andrew Weiss –  bass
Paul Della Pelle – drums

References

2013 albums
Jello Biafra and the Guantanamo School of Medicine albums
Alternative Tentacles albums